The 2022 Atlético Ottawa season was the third season in the history of Atlético Ottawa. In addition to the Canadian Premier League, the club competed in the Canadian Championship. This was the club's first season under head coach Carlos González after the departure of Mista following the 2021 season.

Current squad 
As of September 1, 2022

Transfers

In

Transferred in

Loans in

Draft picks 
Atlético Ottawa made the following selections in the 2022 CPL–U Sports Draft. Draft picks are not automatically signed to the team roster. Only those who were signed to a contract will be listed as transfers in.

Out

Transferred out

Pre-season friendlies

Competitions

Canadian Premier League

Table

Results summary

Results by Match

Matches

Playoff matches

Canadian Championship

Statistics

Squad and statistics 

|-

|}

Top scorers

Clean sheets

Disciplinary record

References

External links

Atlético Ottawa seasons
Atleti
Atleti